VA-111 may refer to:
Attack Squadron 111 (U.S. Navy)
State Route 111 (Virginia)
VA-111 Shkval, a Russian supercaviting submarine torpedo